Harold La Borde was a Trinidadian sailor and adventurer who from 1969 to 1973 circumnavigated the world in his 40-ft ketch Hummingbird II. He was accompanied by his wife, Kwailan, and his five-year-old son Pierre. As the first known Trinidadian sailors to cross the Atlantic and later to circumnavigate, Harold and Kwailan were awarded the Gold Trinity Cross.

Biography 
Harold was born on 18 June 1933, Trinidad, West Indies, to parents with mixed ethnicity. He was educated at a local Roman Catholic school and began his sailing career by building dinghies, in which he taught himself the rudiments of seamanship. 

In his first book, An Ocean to Ourselves (1962), La Borde tells how he built a 26-foot ketch Humming Bird. Harold and Kwailan, who were married in 1959, made their maiden voyage in the 26-foot vessel, Humming Bird, to England in 1960, together with a friend, Buck Wong Chong. The Humming Bird was subsequently sold, and Harold says "is somewhere in Europe" in order to finance the construction of a second, bigger boat. 

In 1960, at the early stages of the country's independence, the La Bordes were both invited to work within the Citizenship and Leadership Training Center at Kurra Falls, Nigeria. The centre was financially supported by the British Regime  with the aim of moulding young leaders. A few years later they returned to Trinidad to begin construction of the 40-foot ketch Humming Bird II. 

The boat was completed in three years, and the family set out on 2 February 1969 to circumnavigate the globe. Upon completion, Harold and Kwailan were both awarded their nation's highest award, the Trinity Cross for their seafaring adventure. Their second son, Andre, was born in Auckland, New Zealand, during the voyage.

Upon their return home, the 40-foot Humming Bird II was purchased by the Trinidad and Tobago Government in 1973, and can be now seen in a museum.

The La Bordes went on to another circumnavigation voyage via Cape Horn (1984–86) in the Humming Bird III.

Harold La Borde T.C. also wrote a further two books with input from his family, wife Kwailan and sons Pierre and André, All Oceans Blue (1977), and Lonely Oceans South (1987).

Documentary films of their travels were made in conjunction with the Government Film Unit. After retiring from their respective jobs in Trinidad, the La Bordes ran a small family marina in Trinidad's busiest yachting bay. Harold's full-time job was working on the Humming Bird III, every day while Kwailan finished their autobiography which includes all of their sailing voyages to the present, entitled Wind, Sea, and Faith.

Harold La Borde died on 12 June 2016, leaving behind his wife, sons Pierre and Andre, three grandchildren and his brothers Rudy and Hugh.

References

External links
Trinidad National Website
Wind, Sea, and Faith - Published book
Trinidad & Tobago Express
Trinidad Guardian
Daily Express
http://www.guardian.co.tt/news/2016-06-20/sons-honoured-sail-home-la-borde%E2%80%99s-body

1933 births
2016 deaths
Circumnavigators of the globe
Trinidad and Tobago sailors